First Light: The Story of the Boy Who Became a Man in the War-Torn Skies Above Britain is a 2002 memoir by Geoffrey Wellum, a Royal Air Force fighter pilot in the Second World War.

Synopsis
The book opens with Wellum's interview for the Royal Air Force and his training. It then shifts to his participation in the Battle of Britain and to his participation in Operation Pedestal, flying planes to Malta off an aircraft carrier. It then closes with him being grounded, recovering from sinusitis and then returning to duty as a test pilot.

Adaptation
It was adapted in 2010 as a drama documentary that premiered on 14 September 2010 on BBC 2 as part of the BBC's commemorations of the 70th anniversary of Battle of Britain, with Wellum himself narrating and the young Wellum played by Sam Heughan.

References

External links
 First Light @ BBC Programmes 

British memoirs
BBC television dramas
Battle of Britain films
World War II television series
2010 British television series debuts
2010 British television series endings
World War II memoirs
2003 non-fiction books
Aviation books
Viking Press books